Marius is a lunar impact crater located on the Oceanus Procellarum. The surface to the west and north of this crater contains a large number of lunar domes spread across an area over a hundred kilometers in diameter that may be of volcanic origin dubbed the Marius Hills. These domes, if volcanic, may have been formed by magma that is fairly more viscous than the volcanic material that formed the basaltic lunar maria. The nearest named crater feature is Reiner to the southwest. Kepler is located to the east-southeast, and rays from that formation reach the rim of Marius.

The floor of Marius has been flooded by basaltic lava, and the surface is relatively smooth and flat. There is no central rise, but a small craterlet Marius G lies in the northeast part of the floor. The crater rim is low and generally circular in form.

The area of this crater was one of the locations proposed for an Apollo mission, but the expedition was subsequently cancelled. About 50 kilometres to the southeast was the landing site of the Luna 7 probe.

One of the numerous rilles in the crater's surrounding area has been found to host a probable cave skylight of a lava cave in 2009.  Observations by the Japanese probe SELENE indicate the hole is about 90 meters deep, and the roof — the top part of the tube — is about 25 meters thick. This would be a likely location to consider moon colonization should the hole connect to a long enough section of ancient lava tube.

Satellite craters
By convention these features are identified on lunar maps by placing the letter on the side of the crater midpoint that is closest to Marius.

Popular Culture
Within the Sega CD RPG Lunar: The Silver Star (and all subsequent remakes) there is a region called the Marius Zone, which is named after the Marius crater.

References

External links

Impact craters on the Moon